Preprismatoolithus is a Late Jurassic oogenus. The species P. coloradensis is described by John Foster as being "of the prismatic basic type," with subspherical eggs about 10 cm (4 inches) in diameter. This oospecies has been initially attributed to "hypsilophodontid" dinosaurs, although a lack of associated embryo material currently makes confirming the egg-layer's identity impossible, but now is known to be theropod after the finding in Portugal, associated with the embryos.

Eggshell present in great abundance at the so-called "Young Egg Locality" which seems to have been a dinosaur nesting ground. Congeneric eggshell fossils are found at additional Colorado sites including the Fruita Paleontological Area, the Uravan Locality and Garden Park.

See also
 Dinosaurs of the Morrison Formation

Footnotes

References
 Foster, J. (2007). Jurassic West: The Dinosaurs of the Morrison Formation and Their World. Indiana University Press. 389pp. .

Dinosaur trace fossils
Fossil parataxa described in 1996